Mohawks of Kanesatake or Kanehsatà:kehró:non are a Mohawk First Nation in Quebec, Canada. In 2016 the band has a registered population of 2,508 members. They also share the uninhabited reserve of Doncaster 17 with the Mohawks of Kahnawá:ke for hunting and fishing.

Demographics 
Members of the Kanesatake First Nation are Mohawk. In October 2016, the band had a total registered population of 2,508 members, 1,115 of whom lived off reserve.

Geography 

44% of the Mohawks of Kanesatake live in the Indian reserve of Kanesatake Lands located 53 km west of Montreal in Quebec. The reserve covers an area of 907.7 ha. The band also shares the uninhabited reserve of Doncaster 17 located 16 km northeast of Sainte-Agathe-des-Monts with the Mohawks of Kahnawá:ke for hunting and fishing. The band is headquartered in Kanesatake. The closest important cities are Laval and Montreal.

Governance 
Mohawks of Kanesatake are governed by a band council elected according to a custom electoral system based on Section 11 of the Indian Act. For the 2014 to 2017 tenure, this council is composed of the chief Serge Simon and six counselors.

See also 

 Kanesatake, Quebec
 Mohawk people
 Oka crisis

References

External links 
 First Nation Detail by Indigenous and Northern Affairs Canada

First Nations in Quebec
First Nations governments